Chase H.Q. 2 (チェイスH.Q.2) is a racing video game released in 2007 by Taito and developed by Gamewax in their London studio,. It is the sequel to Chase H.Q.. The game follows the formula of the original, but uses 3D graphics.

The character Nancy in the FMV segments of the game was portrayed by English glamour model and actress, Jakki Degg.

Gameplay
The player takes control of three vehicles. One of which is a modern stock sports car, a patrol sports car and a striped muscle car. Each level consists of one simple goal of racing to the end with the intent of defeating the villain vehicle, which has to be damaged enough to be taken down and the criminals taken into custody. Some villains have tricky tactics that make gameplay more challenging. Gameplay is also based on a point system.

Unlike previous Chase H.Q. games (including  Special Criminal Investigation and Super Chase: Criminal Termination), the game uses fictional automobiles modeled after real life cars.

References

External links
Taito page
AOU 2007: Chase H.Q. 2 on patrol
Chase H.Q. 2 at Arcade History
 Gamewax's website (Archived)
 Interview with Chase HQ 2's designer, Maasaki Kukino

2007 video games
Arcade video games
Arcade-only video games
Racing video games
Single-player video games
Video games about police officers
Taito arcade games
Video games developed in Japan